Saint-Remy-en-Bouzemont-Saint-Genest-et-Isson is a commune in the Marne department in north-eastern France.

It is the commune in France with the longest name.

See also
Communes of the Marne department
List of long place names

References

Saintremyenbouzemontsaintgenestetisson